Cawthorpe is a hamlet in the civil parish of Bourne , in the South Kesteven district of Lincolnshire, England.

Cawthorpe holds four Grade II listed buildings: Cawthorpe Hall, Cawthorpe House, Ivy Nook cottage, and an 18th-century farmhouse.

References

External links

"Cawthorpe", Bourne homepages.which.net. Retrieved 13 July 2011

Villages in Lincolnshire
South Kesteven District